David S. Ahn is an economist and professor at the Olin Business School of Washington University in St. Louis.

Ahn works particularly in economic theory and mathematical economics. Ahn is an associate editor with Theoretical Economics. From 2013 to 2019, Ahn was an associate editor with the Journal of Economic Theory.

References

Living people
American economists
University of California, Berkeley College of Letters and Science faculty
Emory University alumni
Year of birth missing (living people)
Washington University in St. Louis faculty
Stanford University School of Humanities and Sciences alumni